Holes in the Soup is a Danish comedy film released in 1988.  A farce, it features comedians Morten Lorentzen and Povl Erik Carstensen as John and Aage.  Lorentzen and Carstensen later recorded a live stand-up comedy version of the film, which they released on DVD, John & Aage - Huller I Suppen.

Cast
Morten Lorentzen	... 	Host / John
Povl Erik Carstensen	... 	Host / Aage
Arne Siemsen		
Joakim Solberg	... 	Magician
Jørn Boelsmand Nielsen		
Birgitte Ohsten Rasmussen		
Ellen Hillingsø

References

External links
 
 

1988 films
1980s Danish-language films
1988 comedy films
1980s parody films
Danish comedy films